The men's 4 × 100 metre medley relay competition at the 1999 Pan Pacific Swimming Championships took place on August 29 at the Sydney International Aquatic Centre.  The last champion was the United States.

Records
Prior to this competition, the existing world and Pan Pacific records were as follows:

Results
All times are in minutes and seconds.

Heats
Heats weren't performed, as only six teams had entered.

Final 
The final was held on August 29.

References

4 × 100 metre medley relay
1999 Pan Pacific Swimming Championships